Rahul Ramakrishna (born 15 January 1991) is an Indian actor, writer and journalist. He made his debut with the short film, Sainma. He became popular with his role in the 2017 Telugu film, Arjun Reddy.

Early life
Rahul Ramakrishna was born in Hyderabad, Telangana. His father was a yoga instructor and his mother is an assistant editor for a business magazine. He studied mechanical engineering in VJIT Hyderabad but discontinued it after second year.

Career
Rahul Ramakrishna worked as a journalist in evening dailies, Post Noon and Metro India.  He also worked as a translator for journalists visiting Hyderabad on assignments. Along with a short stint as a film review writer for a Hindustan Times affiliated website, Rahul did many varied odd-jobs, as a songwriter, screenwriter, and as a presenter for a television cook show.

Film career
Rahul's affiliation with acting began as a theatre enthusiast where he worked with several theatre groups as part of their production crew. According to his interviews, Rahul developed a keen interest in acting after a workshop with playwright and activist N Madhusudan and Dr. Sagari Ramdas, both of whom Rahul credits as his teachers and guides. His first attempt at acting was in a short film, Sainma directed by Tharun Bhascker Dhaassyam. Following the appreciation that poured in both for the film's attempt and aesthetics and for the acting prowess of the entire cast, he signed up to play the main lead's supporting friend in a comic role in the Telugu film, Jayammu Nischayammu Raa starring Srinivasa Reddy and Poorna directed by Sivaraju Kanumuri.

After this, Rahul shot to fame as Shiva, in the film Arjun Reddy, where his character's unwavering loyalty to the lead's combined with wit and emotional support garnered him a massive fan following in the audience and the film fraternity alike.

The success of Arjun Reddy and the widespread recognition furthered his career with instrumental characters in many Telugu films of 2018 such as Bharat Ane Nenu, Sammohanam, Chi La Sow. Rahul repeated his "hero's best friend" role and combination with actor Vijay Deverakonda in the film Geetha Govindam. In 2020 he appeared in Ala Vaikunthapurramuloo.

In late 2018, Rahul announced that he will be marrying his girlfriend, however, he later postponed the marriage citing busy shooting schedules.

Filmography
As actor

As lyricist
Sainma (2014)
Pelli Choopulu (2016)

Awards and nominations

References

External links

Male actors from Hyderabad, India
1991 births
Living people
Indian male actors
Male actors in Telugu cinema
Indian male comedians
Telugu male actors
Telugu playback singers
21st-century Indian male singers
21st-century Indian singers
21st-century Indian male actors
Indian male film actors
Indian male playback singers
Telugu comedians
Indian film critics
Zee Cine Awards Telugu winners